Swing High is a 1932 American Pre-Code short documentary film directed by Jack Cummings. In 1932, it was nominated for an Academy Award at the 5th Academy Awards for Best Short Subject (Novelty). The film documents The Flying Codonas, a family of flying trapeze artists.

Cast
 Pete Smith as narrator (voice)
 The Flying Codonas as Themselves:
 Edward Codona as himself
 Lalo Codona as himself
 Alfredo Codona as himself
 Vera Codona as herself

References

External links

1932 films
1932 documentary films
1930s short documentary films
Black-and-white documentary films
American black-and-white films
Films produced by Pete Smith (film producer)
Films directed by Jack Cummings
Documentary films about circus performers
American short documentary films
1930s English-language films
1930s American films